Ventsislav Hristov (born 9 November 1988) is a Bulgarian professional footballer who plays as a forward for Botev Vratsa.

Personal life
Hristov was born in Sofia to a Bulgarian father and a Ukrainian mother. He began playing football at an early age with local side Lokomotiv Sofia and spent several years developing in the club's youth academy.

Career

Early career
After progressing through the Lokomotiv youth system, Hristov was promoted to the first team squad for the 2006–07 season and plays in one match, coming as a substitute. He then played for Sportist Svoge and Nesebar in the Bulgarian B Group.

Montana
In June 2010, Hristov joined Montana. On 1 August 2010, he made his debut in a 1–0 home loss against Lokomotiv Sofia. Hristov made 30 appearances during the 2010–11 season, finishing with 6 goals. He also made 5 assists.

Chernomorets Burgas
On 15 June 2011, Hristov joined Chernomorets Burgas. He marked his league debut for Chernomorets with a winning goal, scoring the only in a 1–0 win over Kaliakra Kavarna on 6 August.

In January 2013, Hristov terminated his contract with Chernomorets.

Beroe Stara Zagora
On 15 January 2013, Beroe Stara Zagora confirmed they had signed Hristov on a two-and-a-half-year contract. He made his debut in a 0–0 away draw against Botev Vratsa on 2 March, playing the full 90 minutes. On 16 March, he scored his first goal for Beroe in a 2–0 win against Etar 1924.

On 10 July, Hristov scored the opening goal in the 2013 Bulgarian Supercup final against Ludogorets Razgrad. Ludogorets subsequently equalised, but Beroe still won the game through penalty shootout. On 18 July, Hristov netted Beroe's only goal in their 4–1 home loss against Hapoel Tel Aviv in the second qualifying round of Europa League. Hristov scored the second goal in Beroe's 2–0 win over Slavia Sofia in the first round of 2013–14 A PFG season on 22 July.

Metalurh Donetsk (loan)
In the beginning of 2014, Hristov was close to being transferred to CSKA Sofia, but eventually joined Metalurh Donetsk on loan for the rest of the season due to the precarious financial situation of CSKA. He made his debut for Metalurh in a 3–1 home loss against Volyn Lutsk on 29 March, coming on as a substitute for Vasileios Pliatsikas.

Return to Beroe Stara Zagora
Hristov returned to Beroe at the end of the season having made only 4 appearances for Metalurh Donetsk in the Ukrainian Premier League. On 16 August 2014, in a 2–0 away victory over Slavia Sofia, he netted his first goal of the season and assisted Salim Kerkar. On 13 September, Hristov scored his first-ever hat-trick in Beroe's 4–0 home win over Marek Dupnitsa. A week later, he scored his 6th goal in the last five games in a 3–0 away win against Lokomotiv Plovdiv.

HNK Rijeka
On 23 January, Hristov signed a -year deal with Croatian side HNK Rijeka for an undisclosed fee.

PFC Levski Sofia
On 3 February 2016, Hristov signed with PFC Levski Sofia until the end of the season after his contract with HNK Rijeka was terminated. His first goal for the club came in a game against PFC Lokomotiv Plovdiv. He scored again in the following fixture against PFC Pirin Blagoevgrad. He continued his fine form with consecutive goals in the games against PFC Beroe Stara Zagora and PFC Botev Plovdiv and a hat-trick in a league game against PFC Cherno More Varna bringing his total to 7 goals in his first 10 games making him PFC Levski Sofia top goalscorer for the current season.

SKA-Khabarovsk
On 5 August 2017, Hristov signed a one year contract with Russian Premier League side SKA-Khabarovsk. He was released from his SKA contract by mutual consent on 1 February 2018.

Arda
On 1 July 2018, Hristov signed with Second League club Arda Kardzhali for 2+1 years.

Tsarsko Selo
Hristov had a stint with Tsarsko Selo in the autumn of 2019.

Botev Vratsa
In July 2022 he joined Botev Vratsa.

International career
On 8 August 2013, Hristov was called up to the Bulgaria national team by manager Lyuboslav Penev for a friendly match against Macedonia on 14 August. He came on as a substitute for Ivelin Popov in the 55th minute. Hristov made his first start on 15 October 2013, in a 0–1 home loss against the Czech Republic in a World Cup qualifier. He was replaced by Simeon Slavchev in the 73rd minute. He scored his first goal for the national team against Azerbaijan in the EURO 2016 qualifying game, scoring the winning goal in the 88th minute.

International goals
Scores and results lists Bulgaria's goals first

Career statistics

Club

Notes

Honours

Club
Beroe
Bulgarian Cup: 2012–13
Bulgarian Supercup: 2013

References

External links 
 
 
 Sportal.bg profile
 

1988 births
Living people
Footballers from Sofia
Bulgarian footballers
Bulgarian expatriate footballers
Bulgaria international footballers
Bulgarian people of Ukrainian descent
FC Lokomotiv 1929 Sofia players
FC Sportist Svoge players
PFC Nesebar players
FC Montana players
PFC Chernomorets Burgas players
PFC Beroe Stara Zagora players
FC Metalurh Donetsk players
HNK Rijeka players
KF Skënderbeu Korçë players
PFC Levski Sofia players
Neftochimic Burgas players
FC SKA-Khabarovsk players
FC Vereya players
FC Arda Kardzhali players
FC Tsarsko Selo Sofia players
CS Concordia Chiajna players
PFC Slavia Sofia players
First Professional Football League (Bulgaria) players
Second Professional Football League (Bulgaria) players
Ukrainian Premier League players
Croatian Football League players
Kategoria Superiore players
Russian Premier League players
Liga II players
Expatriate footballers in Ukraine
Expatriate footballers in Croatia
Expatriate footballers in Albania
Expatriate footballers in Russia
Expatriate footballers in Romania
Bulgarian expatriate sportspeople in Ukraine
Bulgarian expatriate sportspeople in Croatia
Bulgarian expatriate sportspeople in Albania
Bulgarian expatriate sportspeople in Russia
Bulgarian expatriate sportspeople in Romania
Association football forwards